Yael Naim Dowker (1919–2016) was an English mathematician, prominent especially due to her work in the fields of measure theory, ergodic theory and topological dynamics.

Biography
Yael Naim (later Dowker) was born in Tel Aviv. She left for the United States to study at Johns Hopkins University in Baltimore, Maryland. In 1941, as a graduate student, she met Clifford Hugh Dowker, a Canadian topologist working as an instructor there. The couple married in 1944. From 1943 to  1946 they worked together at the Radiation Laboratory at Massachusetts Institute of Technology. Clifford also worked as a civilian adviser for the United States Air Force during World War II.

Dowker did her doctorate at Radcliffe College (in Cambridge, Massachusetts) under Witold Hurewicz (a Polish mathematician known for the Hurewicz theorem). She published her thesis Invariant measure and the ergodic theorems in 1947 and received her Ph.D in 1948. 
In the period between 1948 and 1949, she did post-doctoral work at the Institute for Advanced Study, located in Princeton, New Jersey. A few years after the war, McCarthyism became a common phenomenon in the academic world, with several of the Dowker couple's friends in the mathematical community harassed and one arrested. In 1950, they emigrated to the United Kingdom.

In 1951 Dowker served as a professor at the University of Manchester, and later went on as a professor at the Imperial College London, where she was the first female reader within the department. 
While there, among the students she advised was Bill Parry, who published his thesis in 1960. She also cooperated on some of her work with the Hungarian mathematician Paul Erdős (Erdős' number of one). She worked with her husband with gifted children who were having difficulties at school for the National association for gifted children.

Legacy 
The best PhD award at Imperial College London is given in her name each year.

Works
 Invariant measure and the ergodic theorems, Duke Math. J. 14 (1947), 1051–1061
 Finite and -finite measures, Annals of Mathematics, 54 (1951), 595–608
 The mean and transitive points of homeomorphisms, Annals of Mathematics, 58 (1953), 123–133
 On limit sets in dynamical systems, Proc. London Math. Soc. 4 (1954), 168–176 (with Friedlander, F. G.)
 On minimal sets in dynamical systems, Quart. J. Math. Oxford Ser. (2) 7 (1956), 5–16
 Some examples in ergodic theory, Proc. London Math. Soc. 9 (1959), 227–241 (with Erdős, Paul)

References

External links
 
 

1919 births
20th-century British mathematicians
People from Tel Aviv
Israeli mathematicians
Israeli women scientists
Johns Hopkins University alumni
Radcliffe College alumni
Massachusetts Institute of Technology staff
Academics of the Victoria University of Manchester
Academics of Imperial College London
2016 deaths
20th-century women mathematicians
Israeli emigrants to the United Kingdom